Letefoho, officially Letefoho Administrative Post, is an administrative post (and was formerly a subdistrict) in Ermera municipality, East Timor, Its seat or administrative centre is , and its population  was 19,917.

Letefoho is also known for producing coffee due to its growing condition and altitude. Letefoho coffee is exported to specialty coffee markets.

References

External links 

  – information page on Ministry of State Administration site 

Administrative posts of East Timor
Ermera Municipality